Tap is a 1989 American dance drama film written and directed by Nick Castle and starring Gregory Hines and Sammy Davis Jr.

Plot

Max Washington (Gregory Hines), just released from prison after serving time for burglary, is a talented tap dancer. His late father owned a dance studio that is now run by Little Mo (Sammy Davis Jr.), whose daughter Amy Simms (Suzzanne Douglas) gives lessons to children. Back on the streets, Max isn't interested in dancing again but he is interested in seeing Amy, his former girlfriend. A local gangster, Nicky, doesn't care for Max personally but does try to recruit him to take part in a robbery. Amy has a job as dancer in an upcoming Broadway show and tells its choreographer about Max, hoping to land him a role in the chorus. Max is reluctant to agree to it, then incensed when he is humiliated during the auditions. Max must decide whether to swallow his pride and dance the way the man wants, or give up his art once and for all and return to a life of crime.

Cast
 Gregory Hines as Max Washington
 Sammy Davis Jr. as Little Mo Simms
 Suzzanne Douglas as Amy Simms
 Joe Morton as Nicky
 Savion Glover as Louis Simms
 Terrence E. McNally as Bob Wythe

Production 
Tap was the final feature film appearance of Sammy Davis Jr. (he would co-star in the 1990 TV movie The Kid Who Loved Christmas, which aired after his death).

The cast also included Suzzanne Douglas, Savion Glover, Joe Morton, and Terrence E. McNally. The original score was composed by James Newton Howard and the dance routines performed in Washington's old hangout, a club patronized by "hoofers", were choreographed by Henry LeTang. Also included are cameos, particularly during a challenge sequence, by veteran dancers Arthur Duncan, Bunny Briggs, Howard Sims, Steve Condos, Harold Nicholas, and Jimmy Slyde.

Reception
In the Chicago Sun-Times, film critic Roger Ebert gave the film 3 out of 4 stars, writing:Imagine how Bruce Springsteen would feel if rock 'n' roll lost its popularity overnight and you'd know, I guess, how the great tap dancers felt in the early 1950s. One day, tap dancing was enormously popular... The next day, it was passe - blown away by rock. And there was another cruel blow for many of the tap stars, who were black: As the Civil rights movement gained strength, tap dancing itself was seen as projecting the wrong image of black people... [Parts] of this plot seem recycled out of old musicals, all right, but the spirit of the film is fresh and the characters are convincing. Hines has been dancing professionally since he was a juvenile in the 1950s, but he's better known as an actor, and here he has a role that challenges him on both levels. He has a way of being strong and being subtle about it. Davis has never had a juicier role in a movie, and for once he isn't playing himself; he's playing the opposite of glitter and glitz, and his sincerity is believable.

See also
 List of American films of 1989

References

External links
 
 
 

1989 films
1989 drama films
Films directed by Nick Castle
Films scored by James Newton Howard
Tap dance films
African-American drama films
1980s English-language films
1980s American films